Kerem İnan (born 25 March 1980) is a Turkish professional football goalkeeper who plays for Erokspor.

Career statistics

Honours
 Galatasaray
 Turkish League: 2 (1999–00, 2001–02)
 Turkish Cup: 2 (1998–99, 1999–00) 
 UEFA Cup: 1 (1999–00)
 UEFA Super Cup: 1 (2000)

References

External links

1980 births
Living people
Footballers from Istanbul
Turkish footballers
Turkey under-21 international footballers
Association football goalkeepers
Süper Lig players
Galatasaray A2 footballers
Galatasaray S.K. footballers
Çaykur Rizespor footballers
Samsunspor footballers
Turanspor footballers
Karşıyaka S.K. footballers
Mersin İdman Yurdu footballers
Turkey youth international footballers
UEFA Cup winning players